Benjamin Hendrickson (August 26, 1950 – July 3, 2006) was an American actor known for playing Harold "Hal" Munson Jr., the Chief of Detectives for the fictional town of Oakdale on the daytime soap opera As the World Turns.

Theater and film 
Hendrickson was born in Huntington, New York. He studied at the Juilliard School as part of the institution's first drama division class and was a founding member of John Houseman's The Acting Company.

Prior to his television appearances, Hendrickson acted in theatre. From 1973 to 1984, he appeared in a host of productions that included The Elephant Man (taking over the title part in 1981 after serving as David Bowie's understudy), Awake and Sing and Strider.

Hendrickson also acted in feature films. He originated the role of Frederick Chilton, Hannibal Lecter's pompous, incompetent psychiatrist, in the 1986 film Manhunter; the part was later played by Anthony Heald in the Silence of the Lambs (1991) and Red Dragon (2002) and Raúl Esparza in the TV series Hannibal (2013-2015). Hendrickson's other credits include Dreams Don't Die (1982), Russkies (1987), Regarding Henry (1991), Consenting Adults (1992) and Spanking the Monkey (1994).

Television 
Hendrickson made appearances on daytime television in the early 1980s; his credits included Another World, Texas, and a notable role on Guiding Light as the villainous Silas Crocker. 

However, Hendrickson was best known for playing Harold "Hal" Munson Jr., the Chief of Detectives for the fictional town of Oakdale on the long-running daytime soap opera As the World Turns.

He played Hal for over 20 years, from October 1985 to September 2004 and from June 2005 to July 2006. Hal was initially a short-term role, but as Hendrickson joked, when he "impregnated the leading lady" (the character of Margo, then played by Hillary B. Smith), he signed a contract with a longer term.

Hendrickson won the Daytime Emmy Award for Outstanding Supporting Actor for playing Hal in 2003. During his acceptance speech, he honored his source of moral support with a joke: "To my mother, who scrimped and saved to send me to Juilliard to study the classics... I'm sorry."

Death 
Hendrickson's body was discovered on July 3, 2006 at his Huntington, New York home. The Suffolk County Police labeled his death a suicide; his body had been found with a gunshot wound to the head.

On screen 
Since daytime soap operas are taped several weeks before airing, Hendrickson's final scenes on As the World Turns were broadcast July 12, 2006, nine days after his death. The July 12 episode featured a brief dedication at the end alerting viewers to his death.

A July 5, 2006 TV Guide article indicated that the role would not be recast; the show addressed the fate of the character onscreen in October 2006, and had Hal Munson die in the line of duty.

Filmography

References

External links 
 
 
 

1950 births
2006 deaths
American male film actors
American male soap opera actors
American male television actors
People from Long Island
Suicides by firearm in New York (state)
Daytime Emmy Award winners
Daytime Emmy Award for Outstanding Supporting Actor in a Drama Series winners
20th-century American male actors
21st-century American male actors
Juilliard School alumni
2006 suicides